Celtus is a Celtic new age band founded by Pat McManus and John McManus of Mama's Boys. The sound of the band was described by their manager to Billboard as "Pink Floyd meets Clannad meets Enigma." The band worked with Nick Beggs, Rupert Hine, Gary Barnacle, Stephen W Tayler, Neil Bennett and been among list of Ayreon guest musicians. Celtus have been hosted by the Classic Rock Society.
After recording two studio albums for Sony S2 the band were surprisingly dropped by their record label. They went on however, recording two further studio albums and a live album on the Shamrock label before disbanding. 
John McManus effectively retired from the spotlight but brother Pat McManus went back to hard rock and started a new band, "The Pat McManus Band" which play regular live shows containing original material, Mama's Boys songs and the occasional classic cover version. John McManus has occasionally joined the band on stage, notably as guest vocalist and bass player for the classic Mamas Boys standard "Needle In The Groove".

Discography
Albums:
 Moonchild, 1997
 Portrait, 1999
 Rooted, 2000
 Live 2000, 2000
 What Goes Around..., 2001

References

Irish folk musical groups
New-age musicians
Celtic music groups